The Key gnaphosid spider (Cesonia irvingi) is a species of ground spider in the family Gnaphosidae. It was discovered by Mello-Leitão in 1944. It is found in the Bahamas, Florida, and Cuba.

References

  (2008): The world spider catalog, version 8.5. American Museum of Natural History.

Gnaphosidae
Spiders of North America
Taxonomy articles created by Polbot
Spiders described in 1944